The Drama Club (Czech: Činoherní klub) is a theatre located in Prague.

The Drama Club was founded by Ladislav Smoček and Jaroslav Vostrý. The opening performance of Piknik took place on 3 March 1965. The actors in the 1970s and 1980s included Petr Čepek, Pavel Landovský, Josef Somr, Jiří Kodet, Jirina Trebicka, Libuše Šafránková and Josef Abrhám. On 19 November 1989, two days after the Velvet revolution, the Civic Forum was founded there. The Drama Club was awarded Alfréd Radok Award in category Theatre of the Year in 2002, and 2008. The current actors include Jaromír Dulava, Ivana Chýlková, Ondřej Vetchý and Petr Nárožný.

Selected performances

2008 – Ptákovina (The Blunder) by Milan Kundera, directed by Ladislav Smoček
2006 – American Buffalo by David Mamet, d. Ondřej Sokol
2005 – The Pillowman by Martin McDonagh, d. Ondřej Sokol
2004 – The Goat, or Who Is Sylvia? by Edward Albee, d. Martin Čičvák, co-production with Slovak Arena Theatre
2004 – Sexual Perversity in Chicago by David Mamet, d. Ondřej Sokol
2002 – The Lonesome West by Martin McDonagh, d. Ondřej Sokol
2000 – Return to the Desert by Bernard-Marie Koltès, d. Roman Polák
1992 – The Miser by Molière, d. Vladimír Strnisko
1991 – Mumraj (The Dance of Fools) by Leo Birinski, d. Ladislav Smoček
1989 – I Served the King of England by Bohumil Hrabal, d. Ivo Krobot
1986 – Noises Off by Michael Frayn, d. Jiří Menzel
1982 – The Gamblers  by Nikolai Gogol, d. Ladislav Smoček
1981 – Něžný barbar by Bohumil Hrabal, d. Ivo Krobot
1981 – Geschichten aus dem Wienerwald by Ödön von Horváth, d. Ladislav Smoček
1978 – Tři v tom by Jaroslav Vostrý, d. Jiří Menzel
1970 – Hurá na Bastilu by Jan Vodňanský and Petr Skoumal, d. Petr Skoumal
1969 – Hodinový hoteliér by Pavel Landovský, d. Evald Schorm
1967 – The Birthday Party by Harold Pinter, d. Jaroslav Vostrý
1967 – The Government Inspector by Nikolai Gogol, d. Jan Kačer
1966 – Crime and Punishment by Fyodor Dostoyevsky, d. Evald Schorm
1966 – Dr. Burke's Strange Afternoon , written and directed by Ladislav Smoček
1965 – Piknik, written and directed by Ladislav Smoček

External links
Official website
EUTA - entry in EUTA database

Theatres in Prague
Theatres completed in 1965
1965 establishments in Czechoslovakia
Velvet Revolution
20th-century architecture in the Czech Republic